Henri de Rarécourt de La Vallée de Pimodan (22 October 1911–18 April 1945) was a French naval officer.

Career
Henri de Pimodan entered the Naval School in 1930. He graduated 6th and chose to serve in the marines.

He sails in the Atlantic aboard the Ville d'Ys then the Jules-Verne, and then in the Mediterranean aboard the Duquesne. In 1937, he was instructor at the École des fusiliers.

At the start of World War II, appointed lieutenant in 1940, he sailed on the cruiser Georges Leygues aboard which he distinguished himself at the Battle of Dakar. He embarked on the cruiser Jean de Vienne based in Toulon.

Embarked on the Jean de Vienne, he witnessed the scuttling of his ship in Toulon on 27 November 1942 with the French fleet. He was then appointed to a staff reclassification service, then to the State Secretariat for Industrial Production. He joined the Resistance, within the Army Resistance Organization.

He was arrested on 5 February 1944 by the Gestapo. Tortured in the annex of the Rue Mallet-Stevens of the French Gestapo, but he refused to speak. He was then deported to the Ludwigslust camp in Nazi Germany. During his captivity, he was promoted to Lieutenant-Commander on 1 March 1945. He died in the camp on 18 April 1945.

Awards
 
 Croix de Guerre 1939–1945

 Médaille de la Résistance

Legacy 
A French aviso launched in 1942, has been named after him.
A French D'Estienne d'Orves-class aviso launched in 1978, has been named after him.

See also
French military ranks

References

1911 births
1945 deaths
People from Pays de la Loire
Recipients of the Croix de Guerre 1939–1945 (France)
Chevaliers of the Légion d'honneur
French Resistance members
Resistance members who died in Nazi concentration camps
People who died in Neuengamme concentration camp
French Navy personnel of World War II